Hamdard is a surname. Notable people with the surname include:

Juma Khan Hamdard, the current governor of Paktia Province, Afghanistan
Sadhu Singh Hamdard, freedom fighter and journalist of Punjab, India
Shakeeb Hamdard a singer of Afghanistan

See also
Hamdard India, pharmaceutical company in India
Hamdard Pakistan, pharmaceutical company in Pakistan
Hamdard Public School, a senior secondary school in New Delhi, India
Hamdard College of Medicine & Dentistry, a college in Karachi, Pakistan
Hamdard University, located in Karachi and Islamabad, Pakistan
Hamdard University Bangladesh, located in Gazaria, Bangladesh
Jamia Hamdard, university located in New Delhi, India